"Somebody Told Me" is a song by American rock band the Killers. It was released as the second official single from the group's debut studio album Hot Fuss (2004), and was written by band members Brandon Flowers, Mark Stoermer, Dave Keuning and Ronnie Vannucci Jr. In an interview with Rolling Stone, Brandon Flowers said: "This is the story of trying to meet someone in a club." It is written in the key of B-flat minor.

When the Killers first started out, their music was little noticed by music buyers and the media, which is why "Somebody Told Me" has been released twice in slightly different forms. The first, with the pink background cover, is the rarer version of the single as it was their first release of it; due to poor sales, not as many were produced. When re-released, the cover art sported a blue background color and is the more common version of the single.

The single peaked at number 51 on the United States Billboard Hot 100. In the United Kingdom, it charted at number 28 upon its first release in March 2004, becoming the band's first hit in the Top 40, it was then re-released in January 2005 and reached number three.

In Australia, the song was ranked number four on Triple J's Hottest 100 of 2004. In 2009, it was voted at number nine in XFM's Top 100 Songs of the Decade.

Composition
Stylistically, "Somebody told Me" has been cited as alternative rock, new wave, and dance-rock. The song is in the verse-chorus form. The intro of the song is a Bm chord, leading into the first verse, which consists of a Bm–Em–B chord progression repeated twice, followed by a pre-chorus of G–A–Bm chord progression repeated twice.

The chorus follows the Bm–G–A–F chord progression repeated twice. The first time through the chorus, the last F chord is cut off. The song has a second verse and chorus, then has a bridge with the chord progression E–G–B–E–B–E–Am–G–E–E–G, which leads into the chorus for a final time.

Critical reception
Billboard called the song "wildly infectious", and "as addictive as nickel slots".  Blender asserted that the single is a "superb blaze of synthesizers and guitars that builds to the year's best one-liner: 'Somebody told me you had a boyfriend who looked like a girlfriend I had in February of last year.'"<ref>Langer, Andy (June 2004), "Rock Radio Wakes Up". Esquire'. 141 (6):48</ref>Entertainment Weekly hailed the single as "three smashingly punchy minutes of garage pop so tightly wound that singer Brandon Flowers seems to be accusing his girl of cheating on him with another woman." Rolling Stone said the single was a "nightclub anthem in the making" and continued, "the acid-tongued 'Somebody Told Me' blasts into outer space on a wave of synthesizers and singer Brandon Flowers' cheeky chorus."

Michael Paoletta of Billboard praised the remixes done by, respectively, Josh Harris and King Unique for "maintaining the original song's integrity" but recommended readers to buy the album, Hot Fuss, rather than the single.

In 2020, Paste ranked the song number six on their list of the 20 greatest Killers songs, and in 2021, American Songwriter ranked the song number three on their list of the 10 greatest Killers songs.

Music video
The music video for "Somebody Told Me", was filmed in February 2004 in California, and was directed by Brett Simon. It shows the Killers performing their song in the moonlight of a desert location, with a giant LED screen displaying rolling, and flashing images of their logo, as well as an alternate version of the video shot during the day. The imagery in the video pays homage to that of "Crystal" by English alternative dance group New Order; the Killers named themselves after the fictitious band performing in the New Order video.

Live performances
The band performed the song during an appearance on an episode of Saturday Night Live, hosted by Topher Grace in 2005. They also performed the song at the Sideshow Lollapalooza in June 2011.

Accolades

Awards

Track listings

US 12-inch vinyl (2004)
A1. "Somebody Told Me" (Josh Harris club)
A2. "Somebody Told Me" (Josh Harris dub)
B1. "Somebody Told Me" (King Unique vocal remix)
B2. "Somebody Told Me" (King Unique's Frogger dub)

UK and Australian CD single (2004)
 "Somebody Told Me"
 "The Ballad of Michael Valentine"
 "Under the Gun"

UK 7-inch single and European CD single (2004)
 "Somebody Told Me"
 "The Ballad of Michael Valentine"

UK CD1 (2005)
 "Somebody Told Me"
 "Show You How"

UK CD2 (2005)
 "Somebody Told Me"
 "Somebody Told Me" (Mylo mix)
 "Somebody Told Me" (King Unique vocal remix)
 U-MYX enhanced section

UK 12-inch single (2005)
A. "Somebody Told Me" (Mylo mix)
B. "Somebody Told Me" (The Glimmers GypRock Mix)

Charts and certifications

Weekly charts

Year-end charts

Certifications

Release history

In popular culture

The song can be heard in the episode of Six Feet Under, "Grinding the Corn", from 2004. The song appears as a master track in Rock Band 4. The song also appears in the background in a bar in a scene from the movie Rocky Balboa.

In 2017, Italian rock band Måneskin covered the song live on Italian X Factor, and released it on their EP Chosen'' (2017). In 2020, American metalcore band Motionless in White released a cover of the song.

References

External links
 The music video for the song released publicly by Universal Media Group.

2004 singles
2004 songs
Island Records singles
The Killers songs
LGBT-related songs
Music videos directed by Brett Simon
Songs written by Brandon Flowers
Songs written by Dave Keuning
Songs written by Mark Stoermer
Songs written by Ronnie Vannucci Jr.
UK Independent Singles Chart number-one singles